The German Judo Federation is an association of German judo. The judo sport in West Germany was organized as a sport from 1949 to 1954 in the Deutscher Athletenbund (DAB). On 8 August 1953 the German Judo Association was founded by Dan-bearers of the German Dan-Kollegium (DDK) like Alfred Rhode of the 1st German Judo-Club (1st DJC in Frankfurt am Main). Alfred Rhode had introduced judo in Germany with the 1st DJC at his Frankfurt summer school in 1932.

The separate areas of responsibility of the two associations DJB and DDK complemented each other when the DJB was founded. The DDK was responsible for the Dan bearers, teacher training, dissemination and teaching of judo and examinations. The DJB was from 1955 alone responsible for the competition events - for national and international tournaments and championships, after the DAB had transferred in December 1954 its responsibility for the judo sport to the DJB.

The DJB was recognized in 1956 by the German Sports Federation and worked together until 1990 together with the DDK. On 2 February 1991, the German Judo Federation of the FRG (DJB) and the German Judo Association of the GDR (DJV) united in Passau under the name German Judo Association. Judo Judges organize judo championships in Germany as well as other professional associations in Germany.

From 3 to 6 October 2013 the judo festival celebrated its 60th anniversary with a judo festival in Cologne. Here were u. a. Individual and team competitions carried out and also courses and demonstrations offered.

Participation
There are 2742 judo clubs in Germany and 150279 judo members

See also
European Judo Championships
History of martial arts
Judo in Germany
List of judo techniques
List of judoka
Martial arts timeline

References

External links
Official website

Sports organizations established in 1953
Judo organizations
Judo
Organisations based in Frankfurt